Pierre de Castelnau (? - died 15 January 1208), French ecclesiastic, made papal legate in 1199 to address the Cathar heresy, he was subsequently murdered in 1208. Following his death Pope Innocent III beatified him by papal order, excommunicated Count Raymond VI of Toulouse, and declared the Albigensian crusade.

Life
Pierre was born in the diocese of Montpellier. He became archdeacon of Maguelonne, and in 1199 was appointed by Pope Innocent III as one of the papal legates for the suppression of the Cathar heresy in Languedoc. In 1202, he made profession as a Cistercian monk at the abbey of Fontfroide, Narbonne, and by 1203 was confirmed as papal legate and chief inquisitor, first in Languedoc, and afterwards at Viviers and Montpellier.

In 1207, Pierre was appointed  was in the Rhone valley and in Provence, where he became involved in the strife between the count of Baux and Raymond VI, Count of Toulouse. Castelnau was assassinated on 15 January 1208, possibly by an agent of Raymond, but this was never proven. Nevertheless, Pope Innocent III held Raymond responsible and Pierre's murder was the immediate cause of Raymond's excommunication and the start of the Albigensian Crusade.

Pierre was beatified, through papal order, in 1208 by Pope Innocent III. The relics of Pierre de Castelnau are interred in the church of the ancient Abbey of St-Gilles.

References

Sources

1208 deaths
French beatified people
12th-century French Roman Catholic priests
Canons (priests)
13th-century venerated Christians
Year of birth unknown
13th-century French Roman Catholic priests